The ...Baby One More Time Tour was the debut concert tour by American entertainer Britney Spears. It supported her debut studio album, ...Baby One More Time (1999), and visited the United States and Canada. The tour was announced in March 1999, with dates released a month later. Tommy Hilfiger was chosen as the tour sponsor. The show was divided into various segments, with each segment being followed by an interlude to the next segment, and it ended with an encore. The setlist consisted of songs from her debut album and several covers. The tour received positive feedback from critics; many highlighted Spears' persona and edgy look.

Background and development
On March 5, 1999, it was reported that Spears was planning her first headlining tour to support her first studio album, ...Baby One More Time (1999). Shortly after, she announced that the tour would start in July. On May 12, 1999, Tommy Hilfiger was announced as the main tour sponsor. During the time of the announcement, Spears was being featured in the "AllStars" campaign launched by the company. Hilfiger spoke about the sponsorship saying,
"My passion for music has always inspired my designs. This year we have really put music in the forefront of everything we do. Britney represents the spirit of Tommy Jeans and of youth today. I cannot think of a better way to continue this exciting year by sponsoring one of today's hottest, young recording artists".
The secondary sponsor was supposed to be Nestlé, but they pulled out soon after provocative photographs of Spears shot by David LaChapelle were published in Rolling Stone. Tour dates were released through Pollstar on April 9, 1999, with the tour kicking off on June 28, 1999, in Pompano Beach, Florida. Several dates were added and rescheduled, and the complete schedule was released two months later.

Spears talked to CNN about her involvement during the development of the tour, stating that she had designed the entire tour herself, including costumes and concept. Spears worked with fashion designer Gia Ventola to create the costumes for her and the dancers. The proscenium stage was simple and had only one main prop, a staircase in the middle. The band was in both sides of the staircase and consisted of five musicians. There were also six dancers, that took the stage during interludes. The setlist consisted of eight songs from her debut album and several covers by well-known artists.

Concert synopsis
The show began with a dance introduction by Spears' dancers among smoke effects. She appeared shortly after at the top of the staircase wearing a hot pink vinyl tube top and white vinyl pants with pink knee patches, to perform "(You Drive Me) Crazy". In "Soda Pop", she danced and interacted with the audience, before leaving the stage while her dancers continued. She appeared sitting on the staircase to sing "Born to Make You Happy" and "From the Bottom of My Broken Heart". The show continued with a dance interlude set to Madonna's "Vogue" in which she named Madonna and Janet Jackson as her biggest inspirations. She then took the stage to perform a cover of Madonna's "Material Girl". After this, she performed two covers of Janet Jackson songs, "Black Cat" and "Nasty". She ended the section with a performance of Sonny & Cher's "The Beat Goes On", accompanied by psychedelic lights. After a dance interlude, she performed the album track "I Will Be There" and a cover of "Open Arms" by Journey, ending with a smile at the top of the staircase. After "Sometimes", she waved and left the stage. The encore consisted of a performance of "...Baby One More Time", in which Spears wore a black bra under pink halter, a pink sequined plaid mini-skirt, and black thigh-high stockings. She then thanks the audience and leaves the stage.

Critical reception
The tour garnered generally positive reviews from critics. Jeffrey Haney of the Deseret News described the show as "funky and flashy". A reporter from USA Today called Spears' performance "assured and energetic". Jim Farber of the New York Daily News pointed out that Spears seemed to have two personas during the show, one when singing songs from her album and a more edgy look when singing the covers. He also added that "Spears' nods to edginess no doubt reflects her desire to grow into a more mature career". Jane Ganahl of the San Francisco Chronicle said that "she may be somewhat entertaining, but she's also just another prefab act – longer on packaging than actual talent".

Broadcasts and recordings 
In August 1999, the concert in Orlando, Florida was filmed for the Disney Channel in Concert series which Spears was also joined by New Kids on the Block member Joey McIntyre (who was embarking on his solo career). The concert entitled Britney Spears and Joey McIntyre in Concert aired on October 16, 1999. In the special, Spears performed seven songs in front of the Rock 'n' Roller Coaster Starring Aerosmith attraction at the Disney Hollywood Studios. It also featured Spears visiting her former routes working at the park during her years of The Mickey Mouse Club and shopping at Downtown Disney with her dancers.

Opening acts

C-Note (select venues)
Steps (select venues)
Boyz N Girlz United (select venues)
P.Y.T. (select venues)
Michael Fredo (select venues)
3rd Storee (select venues)
Divine (select venues)
Sky (select venues)
Joey McIntyre (Orlando)

Setlist
The following setlist was obtained from the concert held on July 29, 1999, at the Paramount Theatre in Oakland, California. It does not represent all concerts for the duration of the tour. 
"(You Drive Me) Crazy"
"Soda Pop"
"Born to Make You Happy"
"From the Bottom of My Broken Heart"
"Material Girl" / "Black Cat" / "Nasty"
"The Beat Goes On"
"I Will Be There"
"Open Arms"
"Sometimes"

Encore
"...Baby One More Time"

Tour dates

Cancelled dates

Selected box office data

Notes

References

External links

Britney Spears concert tours
1999 concert tours